Georges Didi-Huberman FBA (born 13 June 1953) is a French philosopher and art historian.

Biography

Georges Didi-Huberman was born on 13 June 1953 in Saint-Étienne.
He has been a scholar at the French Academy in Rome (Villa Medici) and resident in the Berenson Foundation of Villa I Tatti in Florence.
He teaches at the School for Advanced Studies in the Social Sciences, where he has been a lecturer since 1990.

Honours
He is the 2015 recipient of the Adorno Prize.

In July 2017, Didi-Huberman was elected a Corresponding Fellow of the British Academy (FBA), the United Kingdom's national academy for the humanities and social sciences.

Published work 
 Invention de l’hystérie. Charcot et l’Iconographie photographique de la Salpêtrière, sur l'École de la Salpêtrière, Macula, 1982 (translated into English as Invention of Hysteria: Charcot and the Photographic Iconography of the Salpêtrière, MIT Press, 2004).
 Mémorandum de la peste. Le fléau d’imaginer, Christian Bourgois, 1983.
 La Peinture incarnée followed by Chef-d'œuvre inconnu de Balzac, Minuit, 1985.
 Fra Angelico. Dissemblance et figuration, Flammarion, 1990 (translated into English as Fra Angelico: Dissemblance and Figuration, Univ. of Chicago Press, 1995).
 Devant l’image. Questions posées aux fins d'une histoire de l'art, Minuit, 1990 (translated into English as Confronting Images: Questioning the Ends of a Certain History of Art, Penn State Univ. Press, 2004).
 Ce que nous voyons, ce qui nous regarde, Minuit, 1992.
 Le Cube et le visage. Autour d’une sculpture d’Alberto Giacometti Macula, 1992 (translated into English as The Cube and the Face: Around a Sculpture by Alberto Giacometti, Diaphanes, 2015).
 L'Empreinte du ciel, présentation des Caprices de la foudre, Éditions Antigone, 1994.
 La Ressemblance informe, ou Le gai savoir visuel selon Georges Bataille, Macula, 1995.
 Phasmes. Essais sur l'apparition, Minuit 1998.
 L’Étoilement, sur Simon Hantaï, Minuit, 1998.
 La Demeure, la souche, sur Pascal Convert, Minuit, 1999.
 Ouvrir Vénus. Nudité, rêve, cruauté, Gallimard, 1999.
 Devant le temps, Minuit, 2000.
 Être crâne, sur Giuseppe Penone, Minuit, 2000 (translated into English as Being a Skull: Site, Contact, Thought, Sculpture, Univocal Publishing, 2016).
 L’Homme qui marchait dans la couleur, sur James Turrell, Minuit, 2001 (translated into English as The Man Who Walked in Color, Univocal Publishing, 2017).
 Génie du non-lieu, sur Claudio Parmiggiani, Minuit, 2001.
 L’Image survivante, Minuit, 2002 (translated into English as The Surviving Image: Phantoms of Time and Time of Phantoms, Penn State Univ. Press, 2016).
 Ninfa moderna. Essai sur le drapé tombé, Gallimard, 2002.
 Images malgré tout, Minuit, 2004 (translated into English as Images in Spite of All: Four Photographs from Auschwitz, Univ. of Chicago Press, 2012).
 Gestes d’air et de pierre, Minuit, 2005.
 Le Danseur des solitudes, sur Israel Galván, Minuit, 2006.
 L'Image ouverte. Motifs de l'incarnation dans les arts visuels, Gallimard, 2007.
 La Ressemblance par contact, Minuit, 2008.
 L'Œil de l'histoire – Tome 1 : Quand les images prennent position, Minuit, 2009 (translated into English as The Eye of History: When Images Take Positions, MIT Press, 2018).
 Survivance des lucioles, Minuit, 2009 (translated into English as Survival of the Fireflies, Univ. of Minnesota Press, 2018).
 L'Œil de l'histoire – Tome 2 : Remontages du temps subi, Minuit, 2010. 
 L’Œil de l'Histoire – Tome 3 : Atlas ou le gai savoir inquiet, Minuit, 2011 (translated into English as Atlas, or the Anxious Gay Science, Univ. of Chicago Press, 2018).
 Écorces, Minuit, 2011 (translated into English as Bark, MIT Press, 2017).
 L'Œil de l'histoire – Tome 4 : Peuples exposés, peuples figurants, Minuit, 2012.
 Essayer voir, Minuit, 2014, .

Notes and references 

Revue Nunc numéro 26, février 2012 – Cahier G. Didi-Huberman dirigé par Jérôme de Gramont – Editions de Corlevour

External links 
Bibliographie (2005–2010) du séminaire de Georges Didi-Huberman à l'EHESS, École des Hautes Études en Sciences Sociales.
Vidéo « Au bord de la mémoire »
Interview with Georges Didi-Huberman for Radio Web MACBA (2015) about the problems regarding the way in which we see and interpret images.

French art historians
French philosophers
1953 births
Living people
French male non-fiction writers
Corresponding Fellows of the British Academy
Prix Médicis essai winners